Sexy Susan Sins Again (German: Frau Wirtin hat auch einen Grafen, Italian: Susanna... ed i suoi dolci vizi alla corte del re) is a 1968 Austrian-Italian costume drama-adventure-sex comedy film directed by Franz Antel. It is the first film of the series Frau Wirtin, following the 1967 film The Sweet Sins of Sexy Susan.

Plot
Susanne Delberg (Teri Tordai as Terry Torday) and her friend Ferdinand (Harald Leipnitz) are assigned by Count Andrea (Béla Ernyey) to deliver some documents to his brother Enrico (Jeffrey Hunter), in order to save their family assets from Leduc (Jacques Herlin), the counsellor of Elisa Bonaparte (Pascale Petit). The duo and Susanne's prostitutes guised as an actors' troupe travel to Lucca in the Kingdom of Etruria, managing to save Enrico from an assassination attempt by Leduc and rescue him. On returning to Germany, they learn that Napoleon (Heinrich Schweiger) will meet with Elisa (accompanied by Leduc) in Giessen, Grand Duchy of Hesse and see this as a chance to settle their scores with Leduc.

Cast
Jeffrey Hunter: Count Enrico
Harald Leipnitz: Ferdinand
Pascale Petit: Elisa Bonaparte
Teri Tordai: Susanne Delberg
Jacques Herlin: Leduc
Béla Ernyey: Count Andrea
Gustav Knuth: Mayor of Giessen
Hannelore Auer: Sophie
Femi Benussi: Giovanna
Daniela Giordano: Coralie
Edwige Fenech: Céline
Rosemarie Lindt: Bertha
Judith Dornys: Dorine
Anke Syring: Fiametta
Franz Muxeneder: Pumpernickel
Ralf Wolter: Bookdealer
Heinrich Schweiger: Napoleon Bonaparte

External links

1968 films
1960s sex comedy films
1960s multilingual films
1960s historical comedy films
Austrian historical comedy films
Austrian adventure films
Austrian multilingual films
Austrian sex comedy films
Commedia sexy all'italiana
Italian multilingual films
Italian historical comedy films
Italian adventure comedy films
1960s German-language films
Films directed by Franz Antel
Films scored by Gianni Ferrio
Films set in the 1800s
Films set in Germany
Depictions of Napoleon on film
1968 comedy films
1960s Italian films